Aghcheh Rish (also Romanized as Āghcheh Rīsh; also known as Āghjeh Rīsh and Āghjeh Rīsh Kūrānlū) is a village in Charuymaq-e Sharqi Rural District, Shadian District, Charuymaq County, East Azerbaijan Province, Iran. At the 2006 census, its population was 389, in 59 families.

References 

Populated places in Charuymaq County